Janne Henrik Niinimaa (born May 22, 1975) is a Finnish former professional ice hockey player. He played 10 seasons in the National Hockey League (NHL) for the Philadelphia Flyers, Edmonton Oilers, New York Islanders, Dallas Stars, and Montreal Canadiens. He also played in the Finnish SM-liiga, Swedish Elitserien, Swiss National League A, and Swedish Allsvenskan.

Playing career
Niinimaa was selected in the second round of the 1993 NHL Entry Draft, 36th overall, by the Philadelphia Flyers.

Following three seasons playing with Jokerit in Helsinki, Finland, Niinimaa made his debut with the Flyers in the 1996–97 NHL season, posting 44 points and a +12 rating, and being named to the NHL All-Rookie Team.

In the following 1998 season, Niinimaa was traded to the Edmonton Oilers, where he spent parts of six seasons. He earned himself an All-Star appearance in the 2000–01 NHL regular season. He was traded to the New York Islanders in 2003 and then was traded to the Dallas Stars and Montreal Canadiens. During the NHL lockout, Niinimaa returned to play in his native Finland. Niinimaa has twice represented Finland at the Winter Olympics, winning a bronze medal in 1998, and was on the national team when Finland won its first World Championship gold medal.

Niinimaa retired on 10 February 2014.

Personal life
On 2 August 2008, Niinimaa married Jaana Kehusmaa, a model from Oulu, at Kiiminki Church. Teemu Selänne, Saku Koivu, and Timo Jutila were among the invitees. They separated in July 2012.

Transactions
 26 June 1993 – Drafted by the Philadelphia Flyers
 24 March 1998 – Traded by Philadelphia to the Edmonton Oilers in exchange for Dan McGillis and a 2nd round draft pick (Philadelphia selected Jason Beckett)
 11 March 2003 – Traded by the Edmonton Oilers to the New York Islanders along with a second round draft pick (New York selected Evgeni Tunik) in exchange for Brad Isbister and Raffi Torres
 10 January 2006 – Traded by the New York Islanders to the Dallas Stars along with a fifth round draft pick in exchange for John Erskine and a second round draft pick.
 30 September 2006 – Traded by the Dallas Stars along with a fifth round pick in 2007 to the Montreal Canadiens in exchange for Mike Ribeiro and a 2008 sixth round pick.
 14 September 2007 – Signed by HC Davos of the Swiss National League.
 14 August 2008 – Signed by Kärpät of the SM-liiga.
 27 November 2008 – Signed by SCL Tigers of the Swiss National League.
 16 August 2009 – Signed by HV71 of Elitserien.

Honours and accolades
Elected to the Finnish Ice Hockey Hall of Fame in 2015 as a player.
has played once NHL All-Star Game in 2001.
Won the Swedish Champion (Le Mat Trophy) in 2009–10
Won the Finnish Champion (Kanada-malja) in 1993–94, 1995–96 and 2004–05.
Won the Spengler Cup in 2011.

Career statistics

Regular season and playoffs

International

References

External links
 

1975 births
Living people
20th-century Finnish people
21st-century Finnish people
Asplöven HC players
Dallas Stars players
Edmonton Oilers players
Finnish ice hockey defencemen
Finnish ice hockey world championship gold medalists
HC Davos players
HV71 players
Ice hockey players at the 1998 Winter Olympics
Ice hockey players at the 2002 Winter Olympics
Jokerit players
Luleå HF players
Malmö Redhawks players
Medalists at the 1998 Winter Olympics
Montreal Canadiens players
National Hockey League All-Stars
New York Islanders players
Olympic ice hockey players of Finland
Olympic medalists in ice hockey
Oulun Kärpät players
People from Raahe
Philadelphia Flyers draft picks
Philadelphia Flyers players
SC Rapperswil-Jona Lakers players
SCL Tigers players
Sportspeople from North Ostrobothnia